The Military Personnel Records Center (NPRC-MPR) is a branch of the National Personnel Records Center and is the repository of over 56 million military personnel records and medical records pertaining to retired, discharged, and deceased veterans of the U.S. armed forces.

Its facility is located at 1 Archives Drive in Spanish Lake, a census-designated place in St. Louis County, Missouri, near the City of St. Louis. Its former location was in Overland.

Holdings

Archival records
The new Archival Records became open to unlimited access by the general public with all requests for information to such records responded by providing a copy of the entire file. Those seeking these records were required to pay a fee, whereas the "Non-Archival Records", that is, the bulk of MPRC's holdings, are provided free of charge.  As part of the Archival Records program, a number of notable persons' records were also transferred to the custody of the National Archives and open to general public access.

History

Establishment

The Military Personnel Records Center was designed by architect Minoru Yamasaki, and opened in the fall of 1955 after three years of construction.  The building was originally known as the "Department of Defense Military Personnel Records Center" and was designated as a joint military command housing three separate records centers for the Army, Navy, and Air Force.

Air Force records were considered under the Department of the Army custody at the time of MPRC's opening and were stored at various facilities until July 1, 1956 when the Air Force took custody of its records and moved them to the Air Force Records Center in Kansas City, Missouri.  In 1957, the records were then transferred to MPRC in St. Louis.  United States Marine Corps records had previously been transferred to the center, under Navy auspices, in 1957.  Coast Guard records began to be received in 1958.

On July 1, 1960, the Military Personnel Records Center ceased to be operated by the Defense Department with control transferred to the General Services Administration.  The three active duty military records centers, on site at MPRC (the Air Force Records Center, the Naval Records Management Center and the Army Records Center), were disestablished and consolidated into a single civil service operated records center. The center was then designated as under the administration of the National Archives and Records Service (NARS), itself part of the GSA. In 1966, the military personnel records center merged administratively (but not physically) with the St. Louis Federal Records Center (later known as the Civilian Personnel Records Center or CPR) and became part of the National Personnel Records Center.  The building became then known as the "National Personnel Records Center, Military Personnel Records" (NPRC-MPR)

Later history

In 1965, when photocopy machines became widespread at the Military Personnel Records Center, it became easier to reproduce service records upon request from all interested parties.  Even so, between 1965 and 1973 the Military Personnel Records Center gradually became overwhelmed with the volume of records requests it was receiving and developed a bad reputation as being non-customer friendly, with an average wait time of between 11 and 16 weeks for record responses.

Until 1996, the Military Personnel Records Center operated through a complex system of paperwork forms with little computer automation. The 1980s saw serious complaints against the facility to the extent that the military service departments began procedures to hold their own records rather than have such records sent to the Military Personnel Records Center.

Move to Spanish Lake
Beginning in 2015, the designation "Military Personnel Records Center" was dropped from most official correspondence, with the military records building in Spanish Lake thereafter referred to as the "National Personnel Records Center".  Likewise, the civilian records counterpart was renamed from the Civilian Personnel Records Center to the "NPRC Annex".  The term "National Personnel Records Center" may now refer to both the physical military records building in Spanish Lake, as well as an overall term for the National Archives federal records complexes located in St. Louis.

Incidents

1973 fire

The National Personnel Records Center fire was a catastrophic fire at the records building in St. Louis that burned for more than four days in July 1973 and ultimately destroyed 16 to 18 million Official Military Personnel Files (OMPF). Specifically, it impacted records for Army personnel between 1912 and 1960, and Air Force personnel between 1947 and 1964. The fire was reported after midnight on July 12, and firefighters arrived just 4 minutes and 20 seconds after the first alarm sounded. However, smoke and heat forced firefighters to withdraw shortly after 3 AM, and large amounts of water were applied to the building exterior and through windows in an effort to fight the blaze, which raged out of control for 22 hours. The fire became so severe that local residents were forced to stay inside because of heavy smoke. On July 16, the local fire department finally declared the fire over after a total of 42 fire districts had cooperated to stop it.

Until late July, firefighters continued to spray water in order to stop periodic rekindling of the fire. Broken water lines also flooded the building, with the worst water damage on the 5th floor. Conditions arose for mold growth, and documents were sent to both McDonnell Douglas Corporation vacuum facilities in St. Louis and a NASA facility in Ohio for drying. After the fire, the NPRC began recovery and reconstruction efforts and established an entire new branch to deal with damaged records; staffers searched for alternate sources to supplement lost files, looking for information both within and outside of NPRC holdings. The National Archives has described the 1973 fire as an "unparalleled disaster" to "cultural heritage."

2004 Record scanning hoax 

In August 2004, an Internet hoax claimed that the Military Personnel Records Center was electronically scanning "all military records on site" and would "destroy all hard copies" when the process was complete. The source of the hoax was a sham email circulating online that advised veterans and dependents to request original records via the NPRC if they did not want them to be destroyed. The email had a header that read: "Destruction of Original Military Records, HQ AFR/DP/04-254". According to Scott Levins, assistant director of military records at the NPRC, officials at the center first learned of the hoax in late August, and began analyzing record requests to see if request volume had increased. Director Peter S. Gaytan of the American Legion National Veterans Affairs and Rehabilitation (VA&R) Commission posted a bulletin, dated September 30, warning about the hoax and explaining that the NPRC would only perform scans to "minimize the handling of fragile documents or reduce the time it takes to locate a record." The American Legion VA&R division had directly contacted the NPRC and "confirmed that the e-mail [was] a hoax." In September 2004, the NPRC had a backlog of roughly 120,000 record requests, and Levins voiced concern that the hoax could spur a large influx of new requests. Gaytan warned in his bulletin that a surge in requests could delay document delivery needed for burials, benefits, loans, employment, and other important matters, a concern shared by the National Archives. When it learned of the hoax, the NPRC informed the Department of Defense and modified its online application process to minimize any excess requests. Also, to dispel the rumor, NPRC officials posted a notice on the eVetRecs website stating:

Despite the NPRC warning, National Border Patrol Council (NBPC) officials were deceived by the hoax and posted part of the sham email on their website. It remained posted until news website Federal Computer Week advised the council of the situation on September 21. Rich Pierce, executive vice president of the Border Patrol Council, said the email had come from what he described as "a really good source." The U.S. Coast Guard posted a notice about the hoax in the Military Personnel section of its website, warning of "false reports circulating around the internet to veterans' groups." Federal Computer Week discussed the Coast Guard notice in its September 22, 2004 article on the hoax. The Coast Guard theorized that the "confusion may stem from a recent DOD paper" which stated that Official Military Personnel Files (OMPF) would be retained by the National Archives, and that the military services would have the right to destroy source documents. The cautionary notice remained on the Coast Guard website until at least February 2005. The National Archives confirmed that neither the Department of Defense nor the NPRC planned to destroy any official files held at the NPRC. National Archives officials stressed that all records are permanently archived, meaning that they will never be destroyed and always maintained as historical documents. On September 22, 2004, the National Archives posted a press release on the rumor. The release read in part:

The U.S. Air Force website published an October 1, 2004 article about the hoax, by military reporter Jim Garamone. Garamone said that, contrary to the "internet rumor," National Archives officials were not destroying any records. Also, he reported that according to NPRC officials in St. Louis there had been a "rise in the number of veterans requesting their records." John Constance, the National Archives and Records Administration director of congressional and public affairs, was quoted as saying: "We have a limited number of people to do the work and anything that ramps the requests up this quickly is a big production issue with us." Susan Cooper, the archive's public affairs officer, said that some records were being digitized "for reference and preservation" because frequent handling caused "some wear and tear." The Air Reserve Personnel Center also published Garamone's article in the November/December 2004 issue of its newsletter, and the U.S. Army and U.S. Marine Corps websites both continue, as of 2023, to display notices on the file destruction "urban legend."

2014 Record destruction discovery
In 2014, two employees of the Military Personnel Records Center were discovered to have unlawfully disposed or destroyed over eighteen hundred documents by either abandoning them in lesser used areas of the MPR facility, removing the documents and then destroying them off site, or abandoning the records in a wooded area in western Illinois. 241 documents had been found discarded in the Spanish Lake area in 2012. The two employees were later charged and convicted of destruction of government records; an investigation revealed the majority of the documents had been administrative "interfile" material into military personnel records, most of which pertained to deceased veterans, thus the breach to veteran privacy was considered minimal. U.S. Archivist David S. Ferriero commended investigators who “helped to stop the actions of the individuals involved, and to protect these irreplaceable records.” According to the St. Louis Post-Dispatch, the legal plea of one of the employees involved said that the center "audited records handled by 41 employees in 2011-12 and found that of more than 1,200 records assigned to [the employee], 850 were missing."

After questions from Senator Claire McCaskill, the National Personnel Records Center conducted a further investigation and revealed that an additional ten employees had most likely been involved with the improper disposal of records, with enough evidence from an audit to recommend that five of the employees be dismissed from their posts.  The motivation behind the mishandling and disposal of records was found to be a "bonus system" in which employees who had interfiled documents more quickly into service records were presented with a monetary paycheck award. The bonus system was discontinued, and an interfile audit program was initiated.

Notes

References

External links
 MPRC website
 Online and offline DD-214/personnel records request forms
 a Congressional Research Service (CRS) Report "Military Service Records and Unit Histories: A Guide to Locating Sources" at University of North Texas

1955 establishments in Missouri
buildings and structures in St. Louis County, Missouri
government buildings completed in 1955
government buildings in Missouri
Minoru Yamasaki buildings
National Archives and Records Administration
United States military pay and benefits
Military archives